Bullets in the Gun is the fourteenth studio album by American country music artist Toby Keith. It was released on October 5, 2010 by Show Dog-Universal Music. The album produced three singles with "Trailerhood", the title track, and "Somewhere Else". "Trailerhood" peaked at number 19 on the US Billboard Hot Country Songs chart, while the title track and "Somewhere Else" both reached number 12. This was Keith's first studio album to not produce a single Top 10 hit on the US country charts.

Background
In an interview with Billboard, Keith talked about the recording for Bullets in the Gun, saying ""I'm in a great place right now, I probably wrote 40 or 50 songs in the last year and the songs are getting more and more happy. I did some movies, too, but now I'm just kicking back."

Critical reception

Upon its release, Bullets in the Gun received generally positive reviews from most music critics. At Metacritic, which assigns a normalized rating out of 100 to reviews from mainstream critics, the album received an average score of 76, based on 6 reviews, which indicates "generally favorable reviews".

Bill Friskics-Warren of The Washington Post complimented the tracks on the release, saying "There isn't a weak track on the record, and most of the songs [...] are pretty terrific". Stephen Thomas Erlewine of Allmusic gave the album 4½ out of 5 stars and called it "a lean, tight record", stating "Bullets in the Gun winds up being the Toby Keith album with the lightest touch since 2006’s White Trash with Money." Matt Bjorke with Roughstock commented on the album, saying "Bullets in the Gun is an interesting album and it feels like a joyful mixture of songs about different stages of relationships and life" and called it "Keith’s best album of at least the last five years". Gary Graff with Billboard Magazine gave a favorable review of the album, saying "It's full of shoot-from-the- hip cleverness".

Jessica Phillips with Country Weekly gave it three stars, commented saying that "the album [is packed] with songs meant to heal (or at least dull) a broken heart". Jon Caramanica with The New York Times referred to Bullets in the Gun as "[Keith's] most scattershot album to date; a jumble of attitudes and tactics" and said "[he] is singing without conviction on songs that are mere archetypes and lack any of his signature gestures".

Commercial performance
The album debuted at number one on both the US Billboard 200 chart and Top Country albums chart, selling 71,000 copies in its first week of release. It's the smallest debut at number one since Nielsen SoundScan began tracking the chart in May 1991. In its second week of release, the album dropped to number nine on the Billboard 200 selling 30,000 copies. In its third week of release, the album fell to number twenty one on the Billboard 200, selling 17,923 copies. As of the chart dated May 7, 2011, the album has sold 323,880 copies in the US.

Track listing

Personnel

 Robert Ascroft – photography
 Susie Carlson – stylist
 Kim Debus – stylist
 P.J. Fenech – assistant
 Tom Freitag – assistant
 Jed Hackett – overdubs
 Mills Logan – engineer, mixing, overdub engineer
 Meredith Louie – creative director
 Ken Love – mastering
 Mike Paragone – assistant
 Lowell Reynolds – assistant
 Brien Sager – assistant
 Elaine Shock – creative director
 Andrew Southam – photography
 Todd Tidwell – assistant
 Ted Wheeler – assistant
 Pat Bergeson – acoustic guitar, harmonica, jew's harp
 Bruce Bouton – pedal steel guitar
 Tom Bukovac – electric guitar
 Perry Coleman – background vocals
 Chad Cromwell – drums
 Eric Darken – percussion, vibraphone
 Paul Franklin – dobro, pedal steel guitar
 Kevin "Swine" Grantt – bass guitar
 Kenny Greenberg – electric guitar
 Aubrey Haynie – fiddle
 John Hobbs – organ, piano
 Charlie Judge – synthesizer strings, synthesizer
 Toby Keith – lead vocals, background vocals
 Phil Madeira – accordion, organ, wurlitzer
 Chris McHugh – drums
 Steve Nathan – piano
 Michael Rhodes – bass guitar
 Randy Scruggs – banjo
 Steven Sheehan – acoustic guitar
 Jimmie Lee Sloas – bass guitar
 Ilya Toshinsky – banjo, acoustic guitar, mandolin

Charts

Weekly charts

Year-end charts

References

2010 albums
Show Dog-Universal Music albums
Toby Keith albums
Albums produced by Toby Keith